A tree frog (or treefrog) is any species of frog that spends a major portion of its lifespan in trees, known as an arboreal state. Several lineages of frogs among the Neobatrachia have given rise to treefrogs, although they are not closely related to each other.

Millions of years of convergent evolution have resulted in very similar morphology even in species that are not very closely related.
Furthermore, tree frogs in seasonally arid environments have adapted an extra-epidermal layer of lipid and mucus as an evolutionary convergent response to accommodate the periodic dehydration stress.

Description

As the name implies, these frogs are typically found in trees or other high-growing vegetation. They do not normally descend to the ground, except to mate and spawn, though some build foam nests on leaves and rarely leave the trees at all as adults.

Tree frogs are usually tiny as their weight has to be carried by the branches and twigs in their habitats. While some reach 10 cm (4 in) or more, they are typically smaller and more slender than terrestrial frogs. Tree frogs typically have well-developed discs at the finger and toe tips, they rely on several attachment mechanisms that varies with circumstances, tree frogs require static and dynamic, adhesive and frictional, reversible and repeatable force generation; the fingers and toes themselves, as well as the limbs, tend to be rather small, resulting in a superior grasping ability. The genus Chiromantis of the Rhacophoridae is most extreme in this respect: it can oppose two fingers to the other two, resulting in a vise-like grip.

Family
Tree frogs are members of these families or genera:

 Hylidae, or "true" treefrogs, occur  in the temperate to tropical parts of Eurasia north of the Himalayas, Australia and the Americas.
 Rhacophoridae, or shrub frogs, are the treefrogs of tropical regions around the Indian Ocean: Africa, South Asia and Southeast Asia east to Lydekker's line. A few also occur in East Asia.
 Centrolenidae, or glass frogs, are potentially closely related to hylids; these translucent frogs are native to Central and South America.
 Hyperoliidae, or reed frogs, are closely related to the burrowing Microhylidae; these small frogs are native to sub-Saharan Africa.
 Boophis is a genus of highly arboreal frogs which evolved from the toxic terrestrial Mantellidae of Madagascar.

Gallery

References

Bibliography

External links

 

 01
Frogs
Amphibian common names